Andrei Antonovich Grechko (– 26 April 1976) was a Marshal of the Soviet Union (from 1955). He was Minister of Defence of the Soviet Union from 1967 to 1976.

Early life
Grechko was the thirteenth child born to a family of Ukrainian peasants on 17 October 1903, at a small town near Rostov-on-Don.

Military career

He joined the Red Army in 1919, where he was a part of the "Budyonny Cavalry". During the war, he fought in the Caucasian Front and Southern Front, where fought in battles against the White Army troops of Generals 
Anton Denikin and Pyotr Wrangel, and detachments of Ataman Nestor Makhno, and the elimination of political and criminal banditry.

From September 1921 to July 1922, he served in a separate battalion of OSNAZ in Taganrog. He studied at the Crimean Cavalry courses Named After the All-Russian Central Executive Committee, in which he graduated in August 1923. After graduation, he was sent to study at the Taganrog Cavalry School of the North Caucasian Military District and in August 1924, he was transferred to the North Caucasian Mountain Nationalities Cavalry School in Krasnodar. During his studies, he was a foreman of a squadron and from 1925 to 1926, he participated in military operations against gang formations in Chechnya and Dagestan. He graduated in 1926 and became a member of the Communist Party of the Soviet Union.

From September 1926 to April 1932, he served in the 61st Cavalry Regiment of the 1st Separate Cavalry Brigade at the Moscow Military District, and platoon and machine-gun squadron commander.

Grechko graduated from the Military Academy of the Red Army named after M. V. Frunze in 1936. After graduation, he served in the Special Red Banner Cavalry Division named after I.V. Stalin of the Moscow Military District and later transferred to the Belarusian Special Military District, where he served as assistant chief and chief of the 1st (operational) part of the division headquarters and commander of the 62nd Cavalry Regiment. From May 1938 to October 1938, he served as assistant chief of staff of the division.

He graduated from the academy of the General Staff of the Red Army named after K. E. Voroshilov in June 1941.

World War II

In October 1938, he was appointed as chief of staff of the 62nd Cavalry Regiment. While serving in this position, he participated in the Soviet invasion of Poland.

In the early days of the German invasion of the Soviet Union, Grechko served in the Operational Directorate of the General Staff of the Red Army. Grechko's first command during World War II was of the 34th Cavalry Division, which put up a valiant fight around Kremenchug (near Kyiv) in Ukraine during the First Battle of Kiev. The division was assigned to the 26th, 38th and 6th Armies on the Southwestern Front.

On 15 January 1942, Grechko was put in command of the 5th Cavalry Corps and took part in the Barvenkovo–Lozovaya offensive. From March 1942, he was appointed as commander of the operational group of troops in the Southern Front, which operated in the Donbas. Starting 15 April 1942, Grechko was placed in command of 12th Army and took part in the defense of Voroshilovgrad and from July, took part in the Battle of the Caucasus. In September 1942, Grechko commanded the 47th Army and at the same time acting as commander of the Novorossiysk Defensive Region. He commanded the 47th Army in the Transcaucasian Front from 19 October 1942 and took part in the Tuapse Operation.

From 5 January 1943, Grechko was commander of the 56th Army in the Transcaucasian Front, during which he took part in the North Caucasian Strategic Offensive Operation. After fierce battles in January, his unit broke through the heavily fortified enemy defenses and reached the approaches to Krasnodar. From February to March, as part of the North Caucasian Front, he participated in the Krasnodar Offensive, and then in a number of local and mostly unsuccessful offensive operations of the front troops. In September 1943, the troops of the 56th Army, in cooperation with the 9th and the 18th Armies, liberated the Taman Peninsula from the direction of Novorossiysk, during the Novorossiysk-Taman Strategic Offensive Operation.

Grechko served as the deputy commander of the Voronezh Front from 16 October 1943 and on 20 October, he was appointed as deputy commander of the 1st Ukrainian Front. During this time, he fought in the Battle of the Dnieper and Second Battle of Kiev.

Then, on 14 December 1943, he was made the Commanding General of 1st Guards Army, a position he held until the end of the war. The First Guards Army was a part of the 4th Ukrainian Front, which was led by Col.-Gen. Ivan Yefimovich Petrov. Grechko led the 1st Guards in a number of offensive operations, predominantly in Czechoslovakia, Hungary and into Austria.

Post war
 
After the war, Grechko was the Commanding General of the Kiev Military District, until 1953. Between 1953 and 1957, Grechko was the Commander-in-Chief of Soviet Forces in East Germany. During this time, he commanded the suppression of the East German uprising of 1953.

On 11 March 1955, Grechko, along with five other high-ranking colleagues, all of whom had gained recognition during World War II, was promoted to the rank of Marshal of the Soviet Union. From 1957 to 1960, Grechko was the Commander-in-Chief of the Ground Forces. By decree of the Presidium of the Supreme Soviet of the USSR of 1 February 1958, "for the courage and heroism shown in the fight against the Nazi invaders", Grechko was awarded the title of Hero of the Soviet Union with the Order of Lenin and the Gold Star medal.

From 1960 to 1967, he was the Commander-in-Chief of the Warsaw Pact Forces.

Minister of Defense
On 12 April 1967, Grechko was made the Minister of Defense, taking over shortly after Marshal Rodion Malinovsky died. Grechko served in this capacity until his death in 1976. During the 1970s, Grechko served as the chairman of the editorial commission that produced the official Soviet history of the Second World War.

In January 1968, following the outbreak of the Prague Spring in Czechoslovakia, Grechko was the major planner and supporter of the Warsaw Pact invasion of the country, which stopped Alexander Dubček's Prague Spring liberalisation reforms and strengthened the authoritarian wing of the Communist Party of Czechoslovakia (KSČ). In March 1969, Chinese and Soviet troops fought in violent border clashes near Damansky Island and Tielieketi. In response to the clashes, Grechko strongly persuaded General Secretary of the Communist Party Leonid Brezhnev to carry out a surgical nuclear strike against China, especially targeting the Lop Nur Nuclear Test Site in the Chinese autonomous region of Xinjiang. Due to the resistance of the party factions headed by Mikhail Suslov and Soviet Premier Alexei Kosygin, who went to Beijing to meet with the Chinese leaders to reduce tensions between the two countries, a nuclear war was avoided.

In December 1971, during the Indo-Pakistani War of 1971, Grechko helped to provide military support to India during the war. During the Arab-Israeli conflict, Grechko oversaw the providing of Soviet military support to Arab countries against Israel. In the final days of the Yom Kippur War in 1973, Grechko authorized the Soviet advisers operating the Scud missile brigade stationed in Egypt to fulfill Egyptian request to launch a barrage of missiles at Israeli Defense Forces targets at the Israeli bridgehead on the western bank of the Suez Canal on October 22, just moments before the ceasefire. Seven Israeli soldiers were killed in the attack.

By decree of the Presidium of the Supreme Soviet of the USSR of October 16, 1973, "for services to the Motherland in the construction and strengthening of the Armed Forces of the USSR and in connection with the 70th anniversary of his birth", Grechko was awarded the title of the Hero of the Soviet Union for the second time.

Grechko was an active member in the Communist Party, and was a member of the Politburo. As Minister of Defense, he helped modernize the Soviet Army and was greatly responsible for maintaining the military strength of the Soviet Union. He was also responsible for maintaining Soviet military might and hegemony over Eastern Europe. An ideological and strategic hardliner, and a reluctant supporter of the Strategic Arms Limitation Talks (SALT),  his most notable idea was his assumption that a Third World War would always go nuclear at some point, and as such he planned that if World War III did begin, to launch all-out nuclear strikes against the NATO nations the moment that the war began.  For Grechko, nuclear weapons would be weapons of first resort in a world war, not weapons of last resort. His views had caused opposition within the military and the political leadership, who wanted the Soviet Union to have a second strike capacity in order to prevent a war with the United States from going nuclear immediately as he preferred.

In 1976, shortly before his death, he initiated the deployment of the RSD-10 medium-range ballistic missiles, which led to the NATO Double-Track Decision in the early 1980s.

Death
Grechko died on 26 April 1976, at the age of 72. According to The New York Times, Grechko's medical report which was published by the Soviet press agency TASS stated that he had suffered for a long time from atherosclerosis and coronary insufficiency. He was honoured with a state funeral and cremated on 30 April. The urn containing his ashes is buried by the Kremlin Wall Necropolis.

Personal life
Grechko was married to Claudia Vladimirovna Grehcko (1907-1990), with whom he had a daughter Tatyana Andreevna (1927-2002). Tatyana was married to Soviet and Russian diplomat Yuriy Kirichenko (1936-2017), the son of First Secretary of the Communist Party of Ukraine Aleksey Kirichenko.

According to the memoirs of his contemporaries, Grechko was an enthusiastic fan of the sports club CSKA Moscow. Due to his efforts, the club received not only a new stadium, but also an arena, a base in Arkhangelsk and a host of other sports facilities.

Honours and awards

Foreign

Other honors

Bronze busts honoring Grechko were installed in his hometown at the Kuibyshevo in Rostov Oblast of Russia and Alley of Heroes Monument in Slovakia.
Following his death in 1976, the Order of Lenin and Ushakov Naval Academy was renamed to Order of Lenin and Ushakov Marshal of the Soviet Union A.A. Grechko Naval Academy in honor of him. In 1990, the academy's name was changed to honor Admiral of the Fleet of the Soviet Union Nikolai Kuznetsov.
In 1976, part of the former Mozhayskoye Highway in Moscow from General Yermolov Street to Aminyevskoye Highway was named Marshal Grechko Avenue. 
A secondary school in Kuibyshevo was named in honor of Grechko.
An ore-bulk-oil carrier and oil tanker of the Novorossiysk Shipping Company were named in honor of him.
Memorial plaques honoring Grechko were installed on the former headquarters of the Kyiv military district and former building of the Military Academy of the General Staff of the Armed Forces of Russia in Moscow.
Streets are named after him in:
Russia: Krymsk
Ukraine: Sloviansk, Rovenky, Dnipro, Khmelnytsky and Shostka
Uzbekistan: Nukus
As part of the decommunization laws in Ukraine, Greckho Streets in Zhytomyr and Kyiv were renamed to honor Vsevolod Petriv and Ivan Vyhovsky respectively.

Selected works
Great Feat of the Soviet People (1970)
Battle for the Caucasus (1971)
Through the Carpathians (1972)
Liberation of Kiev (1973)
Liberation Mission of the Soviet Armed Forces in the Second World War (1975)
Years of War 1941—1943 (1976)
The Armed Forces of the Soviet Union (1977)
Source:

References

External links

 The Armed Forces of the Soviet Union, book by Grechko published in 1975 and translated into English in 1977
 Liberation Mission of the Soviet Armed Forces in the Second World War, book edited by Grechko and published (with English translation) in 1975

1903 births
1976 deaths
People from Rostov Oblast
People from Don Host Oblast
Politburo of the Central Committee of the Communist Party of the Soviet Union members
Politburo of the Central Committee of the Communist Party of Ukraine (Soviet Union) members
Second convocation members of the Soviet of the Union
Third convocation members of the Soviet of the Union
Fourth convocation members of the Soviet of the Union
Fifth convocation members of the Soviet of the Union
Sixth convocation members of the Soviet of the Union
Seventh convocation members of the Soviet of the Union
Eighth convocation members of the Soviet of the Union
Ninth convocation members of the Soviet of the Union
Soviet Ministers of Defence
Marshals of the Soviet Union
Soviet military personnel of the Russian Civil War
People of the Soviet invasion of Poland
Soviet military personnel of World War II
Ukrainian people of World War II
Warsaw Treaty Organization people
Frunze Military Academy alumni
Military Academy of the General Staff of the Armed Forces of the Soviet Union alumni
Heroes of the Soviet Union
Recipients of the Order of Suvorov, 1st class
Recipients of the Order of Lenin
Recipients of the Order of the Red Banner
Recipients of the Order of Kutuzov, 1st class
Recipients of the Order of Bogdan Khmelnitsky (Soviet Union), 1st class
Recipients of the Order of the Cross of Grunwald, 2nd class
Heroes of the Czechoslovak Socialist Republic
Grand Crosses of the Virtuti Militari
Burials at the Kremlin Wall Necropolis
Recipients of the Patriotic Order of Merit in gold
Commanders of the Order of Polonia Restituta
Grand Crosses of the Order of Polonia Restituta
Recipients of the Czechoslovak War Cross
Recipients of the Military Order of the White Lion
Recipients of the Order of Georgi Dimitrov
Recipients of the Order of Suvorov, 2nd class
Recipients of the Order of the Star of the Romanian Socialist Republic